Scoulton is a small village and civil parish in the county of Norfolk, England, situated  west of the city of Norwich and  north-north-east of Thetford.

The villages name means 'Skuli's farm/settlement'

Scoulton lies on the main road between Norwich and the market town of Watton. Increasingly a dormitory for workers in Norwich's insurance and other service industries, it was traditionally agricultural, relying particularly on the production of sugar beet and on pig farming. It has a fine, partially thatched Saxon church.

The population is split between two main areas of settlement and a number of small, isolated farms. For the purposes of local government, the parish falls within the district of Breckland.

Scoulton is known for its artificial and heavily wooded lake or "mere", which was the product of extensive flint quarrying and a breeding ground of the black-headed gull. Large numbers of eggs were harvested in the Middle Ages. The gull colony survived until at least the 1950s. The harvested eggs formed the basis of a now obsolete dish known as Scoulton Pie. The collection of these eggs is depicted on the village sign.

Notes

http://kepn.nottingham.ac.uk/map/place/Norfolk/Scoulton

External links

Scoulton Parish Council

Villages in Norfolk
Civil parishes in Norfolk
Breckland District